Portrait of Madame de Pompadour is a 1759 oil-on-canvas painting by François Boucher, now in the Wallace Collection in London. It was the last of a series of seven portraits by the artist of Madame de Pompadour. It was first exhibited at the Château de Versailles before passing to the subject's brother.

References

1759 paintings
Paintings in the Wallace Collection
Paintings by François Boucher
Pompadour
Cultural depictions of Madame de Pompadour
Pompadour